Peter Wilson Simpson (born 21 September 1940) is an English former professional footballer. He played as an inside forward.

Career 
He joined the Burnley first team in 1957 but did not play a game for the club until the 1961–62 season. His debut for the Clarets came in the 0–4 defeat to Sheffield Wednesday on 30 April 1962. He went on to make a total of three games in the league for Burnley before joining Bury in 1963. He only stayed with Bury for one season, making four league appearances for the club. After the conclusion of the English season he played abroad in the United States with Boston Metros in 1964. 

In 1965, he played in the Eastern Canada Professional Soccer League with Toronto Italia Falcons. He re-signed with Toronto for the 1966 season. In 1967, he played in the National Professional Soccer League with Toronto Falcons. The following season he played in the National Soccer League with Sudbury Italia. In his debut season with Sudbury he assisted in securing the league championship. After the conclusion of the NSL season he signed with Vancouver Spartans of the Western Canada Soccer League. He returned to play with Vancouver for the 1970 season. 

He then to USA where he played for New York, Boston, and Chicago. Back in Canada, he won the 1969 Challenge Trophy with Vancouver Columbus FC after a 10–0 win over Montréal Ukrainia at the Canadian national championship.

References  

1940 births
Living people
Footballers from Sunderland
English footballers
Association football forwards
Burnley F.C. players
Bury F.C. players
English Football League players
Toronto Italia players
Toronto Falcons (1967–68) players
Eastern Canada Professional Soccer League players
National Professional Soccer League (1967) players
Canadian National Soccer League players
Boston Tigers players